The Sifton Range volcanic complex is an early Cenozoic volcanic complex in southwestern Yukon, Canada. It is the northernmost volcanic center of the Skukum Group and is made of a 700 m thick, shallow-dipping, volcanic sequence dominated by middle lavas and pyroclastic deposits.

See also
Volcanism in Canada
List of volcanoes in Canada

References
Sifton Range volcanic complex and the early tertiary volcanic-plutonic relationship in the northern Canadian cordillera

Volcanoes of Yukon